Olympic Oration or Olympian Oration may refer to:
 Olympic Oration, a mostly lost speech by Gorgias
 Olympic Oration (Lysias), Oration 33 by Lysias
 Olympic Oration or On Man's First Conception of God, Oration 12 by Dio Chrysostom